Illinois High Speed Rail refers to a set of planned high speed rail lines connecting Chicago Union Station (aka the Chicago Hub Network) to various parts of the state and beyond. Two lines already offer increased speeds.

The Michigan Line, which hosts the Blue Water and Wolverine services, has a long section in Indiana and Michigan owned by Amtrak.

Service at speeds of 110 mph and higher was slated to begin in 2019.

There has also been some talk of service from Chicago O'Hare International Airport to Rockford railway station. Studies began in 2015 to look into the construction and contracting on the project.

In 2022, Amtrak received $3,000,000 in federal funds to support the final design of improvements to the concourse level of Chicago Union Station. Amtrak, Illinois Department of Transportation, Metra, Chicago Department of Transportation, and Cook County will provide a 50% match. The same year, Amtrak submitted an application for $251 million in federal funding aimed at supporting several goals considered necessary by advocates for high-speed rail in the midwest. The Chicago DOT, Cook County, Illinois DOT, Michigan DOT and Metra are funding partners in the program.

References

External links 
 IDOT Illinois High Speed Rail

High-speed railway lines in the United States
Proposed railway lines in Illinois
Rail transportation in Illinois